Campus SuperStar is a Singaporean television music competition to find new singing talent. Contestants are students from secondary schools, junior colleges and institutes of technical education. The second season began airing on MediaCorp Channel U on 28 May 2007 and ended on 25 August 2007. This is the only season of Campus SuperStar where the grand finals were held on Saturday instead of a traditional Sunday.

Li Feihui was the only judge from the previous season to return, and was joined by Jim Lim and Jimmy Ye, who all appeared as judges for the first time. Previous judges Foong Wai See and Cavin Soh did not return, though Soh would later appear as a guest judge in season 3. Dasmond Koh and Pornsak hosted the show.

This is the last season of Campus SuperStar to use male and female categories and have 20 finalists, before reducing to 12 acts and the removal of categories on the following season, which aired in 2009.

The male category winner, Shawn Tok, from Loyang View Secondary School (then called Loyang Secondary School), was declared the winner of the season, beating the female category winner Keely Wee from Victoria Junior College. Tok was the first previously eliminated contestant to win  Campus Superstar, and he received a two-year MediaCorp management contract and a cash prize of $2,000.

The season also introduced to two contestants: 18-year old Xu Bin and 16-year old Stella Seah (known in the show as Huixian), who would later become a full-time Mediacorp actor and a successful songwriter, respectively.

Judges and hosts
Li Feihui was confirmed to be returning to the judging panel after judging season one of the show. Season one judges Foong Wai See and Cavin Soh did not return as a judge for the second season. It was announced that two new judges would be brought in to replace both Foong and Soh on the judging panel. Jim Lim and Jimmy Ye were instated as the second and third judge. Jimmy Ye was also brought in as the vocal coach for the contestants.

Season one host Dasmond Koh returned to host the show. Former season one hosts Hong Junyang and Sugianto left the show and their position was taken over by Pornsak.

Selection process

Applications and first auditions
The audition was opened to students from all secondary schools, junior colleges or institutes of technical education in Singapore. The episode of the auditions was broadcast on 28 May 2007 and was hosted by Fiona Xie. Auditions in front of the judges for season 2 took place at Toa Payoh HDB Hub. Applicants are to report to the venue for the audition in their respective school uniforms. There were approximately 4,500 students applied to take part in the first auditions. The auditions were originally scheduled on 16 March 2007 for the auditionees from the male category and 17 March 2007 for the auditionees from the female category. However, due to overwhelming response, the first auditions were extended for another four days til 19 March 2007. At the end of the first auditions, 100 males and 200 females were put through to the next round of auditions.

Second auditions
The second auditions took place on 31 March 2007 at MediaCorp. The second auditions were held closed-door and there were five judges judging the contestants. At the end of the auditions, 65 contestants were put through to the third and final round of the auditions.

Third auditions
The third and final round of auditions were held on 14 April 2007, once again at Toa Payoh HDB Hub. 24 contestants from the male category and 41 contestants from the female category took part in the auditions. At the end of the third auditions, the judges would select 10 contestants each from both categories to form the final 20. The contestants who were selected as the final 20 were put through to the live shows.

Finalists

Key:
 – Winner
 – Runner-up
 – Gender/Category runner-up
 – Semi-finalist
 – Advanced via Revival

Live shows
The live shows began on 4 June. Each week, the contestants' performances took place on Monday at 8pm and the results were announced on the same night at 11.30pm. As with previous seasons, each live show had a different theme.

The live final included performances from season one top 10 finalists, Project SuperStar season two finalists and Stefanie Sun. Billy Koh and Lee Wei Song were brought in as guest judges during the live final as well.

Results summary
Colour key

Live show details

Week 1: Quarter-final 1 (4 June)
For the next seven weeks until the revival rounds, the weightages for the judges and public votes were 70% and 30%, respectively.
Theme: No theme

Week 2: Quarter-final 2 (11 June)
Theme: No theme

Week 3: Quarter-final 3 (18 June)
Theme: No theme

Week 4: Quarter-final 4 (25 June)
Theme: No theme

Week 5: Quarter-final 5 (2 July)
Theme: No theme
Group performances: "怎么办" (performed by Koh Zheng Ning, Seah Hui Xian and Joanna Teo) and "我又初恋了" (performed by Goh Fu Kuan, Benjamin Hum and Ngeow Zi Jie)

Week 6: Quarter-final 6 (9 July)
Theme: No theme
Group performances: "马德里不思议" (performed by Agnes Low, Elaine Ng and Keely Wee) and "超喜欢你" (performed by He Guo Hao, Marcus Lee and Wan Choon Keat)

Week 7: Revival round (16 July)
Theme: No theme
The first 12 singers who were eliminated from the first six weeks returned to the stage to perform for the revival round. The contestant who received the highest combined score from either the male and female categories would be reinstated from the competition.

Week 8: Semi-final 1 (23 July)
From this week until the Grand Finals, the weightage for judges and public votes were 30% and 70%, respectively.
Theme: Songs from local drama series

Week 9: Semi-final 2 (30 July)
Theme: Songs from local drama series

Week 10: Semi-final 3 (6 August)
Theme: Uptempo dance music

Week 11: Semi-final 4 (13 August)
Theme: Songs composed or performed by the judges

Week 12: Final (20/25 August)
20 August (Prelude)
Musical guests: Muhammad Firhan, Muhammad Nazreen and Muhammad Ridhwan ("空秋千")
All top 20 finalists returned to the stage in this pre-recorded non-elimination performance show. It featured group performances from the finalists as well as a look-back on their journey in the competition.

25 August (Round 1)
Themes: Designated song; uptempo dance music
Group performance: "姐姐妹妹站起来" / "伦敦大桥垮下来" / "爱上爱的味道" (all finalists from female category except Koh Zheng Ning and Keely Wee)
Musical guests: Season one top 10 finalists ("By Now") and Jeremy Kwan, Kelvin Soon, Nat Tan, Tang Lingyi, Jeff Teay, Carrie Yeo and Zhang Lesheng ("摇摇民谣" / "恋之憩" / "想着你的感觉" / "懈逅" / "细水长流")
Music producer and composer Billy Koh and Lee Wei Song were brought in as the guest judges. Guest hosting roles were also brought in during the live final. It featured Lee Teng reporting from Keely Wee's school, Victoria Junior College; Charlyn Lim from Shawn Tok's school, Loyang Secondary School; Fiona Xie from Benjamin Hum's school, Saint Hilda's Secondary School; and Ben Yeo from Koh Zheng Ning's school, Raffles Girls' School (Secondary).

25 August (Round 2)
Themes: Alumni duets; winner's song
Group performance: "离开地球表面" / "进化论" / "大舌头" (all finalists from male category except Benjamin Hum and Shawn Tok)
Musical guest: Stefanie Sun ("逆光" and "我怀念的")

References

External links
 Official website

2007 Singaporean television seasons